Anal Kaatru is a 1983 Indian Tamil-language film written and directed by Komal Swaminathan. The film is based on Swaminathan's play Swarga Bhoomi. It stars Rajesh and Vanitha Krishnachandran. The film was released on 25 March 1983.

Plot

Cast 
Rajesh
Delhi Ganesh
Vanitha
Poovilangu Mohan

Production 
Anal Kaatru is based on the play Swarga Bhoomi. Komal Swaminathan, who wrote the play, returned to direct the film adaptation.

Soundtrack 
The music was composed by Shankar–Ganesh, with lyrics by Ilaiyabharathi.

Release and reception 
Anal Kaatru was released on 25 March 1983. Kalki said the film was not hot air as the title suggests, but cold air.

References

External links 
 

1980s Tamil-language films
1983 films
Films scored by Shankar–Ganesh
Indian films based on plays